Seth Sir Chhaju Ram Lamba (1861–1943) was a Jat tycoon from Bhiwani district of then Punjab (British India) (now Haryana state) and made a fortune in Calcutta during the British Raj period. A philanthropist, he undertook many social improvement projects. He financed the higher studies of Sir Chhotu Ram.

Early life
He was born in a Hindu Jat family in 1861 at Alakhpura in Bawani Khera tehsil, Bhiwani district of then Punjab (current Haryana state). His father was Chaudhary Salig Ram Lamba and had migrated from the village of Gothra in Jhunjhunu district, Rajasthan.

He was married twice. His first wife was from the village Dohaka who died from cholera. He had no son from his first wife. Then he married Lakshmi Devi Rangi of the village Bilawal in Bhiwani district and had children with her.

Career
When in his early 20s, Lamba met Arya Samajist engineer Raisaheb Shivnath Rai, who very much impressed him. Rai took Lamba to Kolkata and for some time Lamba coached Rai’s children and also those of a businessman from Rajgarh. During this work he picked up knowledge of their operations and in particular of the dalali (brokerage business or commission agency). He began to trade in old bags and later shifted to the new bags trade.

Philanthropic work
He adopted two siblings named Neera Arya and her brother Basant. He started many hostels, libraries, Dharamshalas and schools, such as Jat School, Hisar (founded 1924). He financed higher studies of Sir 'Chhotu' Ram Richpal. He was known as Danveer Bhamashah of the Jat race. The British government awarded him the life peerage title of ‘Sir.’He was great follower of Arya Samaj.

Why is he important?
He, was one of the people who actually acted under the British eyes but had a fire for freedom in his breath. He set up secret associations to collectively oppose the rule : without ruining his reputation between the Englishmen.

Death
He died on 7April 1943.

Legacy
Several prominent jat institutes are named after him, including the following:

 CRM JAT College
 Chhaju Ram Law College, Hisar
 Chhaju Ram College of Education, Hisar
 Chhaju Ram Jat Senior Secondary School, Hisar
 Chhaju Ram Public School, Hisar
 Numerous Dharamshalas across the length and breadth of Punjab-Haryana-Rajasthan, often near railway stations. Many now in dilapidated condition and being encroached over

References

People from Bhiwani district
1861 births
1943 deaths
Businesspeople from Kolkata
Businesspeople from Haryana
Indian Knights Bachelor
Knights Bachelor